The Guaraní language belongs to the Tupí-Guaraní branch of the Tupí linguistic family.

There are three distinct groups within the Guaraní subgroup, they are: the Kaiowá, the Mbyá and the Ñandeva.

In Latin America, the indigenous language that is most widely spoken amongst non-indigenous communities is Guaraní. South America is home to more than 280,000 Guaraní people, 51,000 of whom reside in Brazil. The Guaraní people inhabit regions in Brazil, Paraguay, Bolivia, as well as Argentina. There are more than four million speakers of Guaraní across these regions.

The United Nations Educational, Scientific and Cultural Organization (UNESCO) classified Guaraní's language vitality as “vulnerable”. UNESCO's definition of “vulnerable” is meant to highlight that although the majority of Guaraní children can speak Guaraní, the use of the language is restricted to particular contexts (e.g., familial settings). Although the Guaraní language may only be classified as “vulnerable,” there are other languages within the Tupí-Guaraní branch that are classified as “extinct” and “critically endangered” (e.g., Amanayé and Anambé respectively).

The Guaraní language has been an object of study since the arrival of the Jesuits in the seventeenth century. The Guaraní language is a subgroup within the Tupí-Guaraní branch. There are three dialects within the Guaraní subgroup: Mbyá, Kaiowá and Ñandeva. The differences among the three dialects of the Guaraní language can be noted primarily in their distinct phonologies and syntax, as these vary depending on the social context that the language is being used. Of note, the Mbyá prioritize oral transmission. Literacy within the Mbyá received an increased level of importance in the late 1990s as a product of new educational institutions in the villages. Lemle (1971) contends that in spite of there being almost forty dialects within the Tupí-Guaraní family, there exist numerous similarities between the words of these dialects.

Varieties 
Western Bolivian Guarani (a.k.a. Simba), 7,000 speakers
Eastern Bolivian Guarani language (a.k.a. Chiriguano, Chawuncu, Western Argentine Guarani), 55,000 speakers
dialects: Avá (subdialects Chané, Tapieté a.k.a. Ñandeva), Izoceño/Izocenio
Paraguayan Guarani (Guarani proper), 5 million mostly mestizo speakers
Chiripá Guarani (a.k.a. Avá, Nhandéva/Ñandeva, Apytare, Tsiripá/Txiripá), 12,000 speakers
Mbyá Guarani (Mbya), 25,000 speakers

These share some degree of mutual intelligibility and are close to being dialects; however, Chiripá is reported to be intelligible due to bilingualism, not inherently. Also, there is a degree of intelligibility with Kaiwá–Pai Tavytera, which is not included in the Ethnologue. Ethnologue considers Tapieté to be a separate language, intermediate between Eastern Bolivian and Paraguayan, and has shifted from the name Chiripá to Avá, though the latter is ambiguous. Paraguayan Guarani is by far the most widely spoken variety and is what is often meant by the term "Guarani" outside South America.

Literature on the Guarani language 
The Tupí-Guaraní branch within the Tupí family that has been the object of most linguistic studies within this family. As a result, the linguistic literature available on Tupí-Guaraní languages is extensive, ranging from grammars, bibliographies, histories of language development, typological studies, to dissertations on the phonology of the Guaraní language.

According to Silvetti and Silvestri (2015), Guaraní only came to be a written language following the arrival of the Jesuits. Silvetti and Silvestri propound that “it was the Jesuits who gave it a grammar and a syntax and made it into one of the ‘lenguas generales’ used for the evangelization of the natives”.

In light of this, we will highlight important literary works on Guaraní linguistics of three Jesuits, namely: (i) Jesuit Joseph de Anchieta; (ii) Jesuit Antonio Ruiz de Montoya; and lastly, (iii) Jesuit Alonso de Aragona. The first Guaraní grammar written was that of Jesuit Joseph de Anchieta (1595). Ringmacher contends, however, that Jesuit Antonio Ruiz de Montoya's Arte de la lengua Guaraní (1640), a documentation of Guaraní grammar, served as a significant point of reference and departure for all proceeding grammatical works concerning the Guaraní language. Montoya's analysis of the Guaraní morphology and syntax stands accurate until this day. Montoya also produced a Guaraní dictionary known as Tesoro de la Lengua Guaraní (1639). In this work, he not only created the first dictionary of this kind, but also provided examples of contexts in which to use the various words he documented. Lastly, Jesuit Alonso de Aragona produced a pedagogical grammar that was completed in 1629, but only printed in 1979. The intention of Aragona's work was to help those seeking ways to learn Guaraní.

The extensive research conducted as well as the expansive reach of the Guaraní language across Latin America has granted it an important position in the urban landscape. In other words, Guaraní's official status in Paraguay combined with research studies that have followed has allowed for recent projects of standardization.

As efforts move forward to standardize Guaraní, the expansion of its use across sectors in Latin America will only increase. This can be seen with the broad expanse of literature being developed on the structure of Guaraní language, as well as its cultural importance. One of the key proponents in this venture, other than the Guaraní themselves, is academic Robert A. Dooley. Dooley has made an extensive collection of works of the language through his career, usually based around the discourse of the Guaraní-Mbyá language structure. Examples being on how different grammatical structures are understood by the speaker, can completely shift the narrative being shared, or the focus on the pragmatic structuring of Guaraní sentences, clause chaining, or spatial understandings of Guaraní. These research projects done by Dooley are crucial to understanding different cultural aspects, like discourses in relation to translating important religious factors which in turn are important for empowering the Guaraní themselves. This standardization is also supported by academics like Guillaume Thomas, who through examining Guaraní can differentiate between temporal suffixes and as such different tenses, and who through examining differing degrees of nominalization, is able to compare different variants of Guaraní-Mbyá between Argentina, Brazil, and Paraguay, in turn creating a type of database of difference that can be used for reference for the different language styles. Works such as these, and the work of scholars like Estigarribia and Pinta (2017) that compiles recent studies on the Guaraní will become of increasing relevance.

Distribution of Guarani

Paraguay 
Paraguayan Guarani, is, alongside Spanish, one of the official languages of Paraguay. Paraguay's constitution is bilingual, and its state-produced textbooks are typically half in Spanish and half in Guarani.

A variety of Guarani known as Chiripá is also spoken in Paraguay. It is closely related to Paraguayan Guarani, a language which speakers are increasingly switching to. There are 7,000 speakers of Chiripá in Paraguay.

Additionally, another variety of Guarani known as Mbyá is also spoken in Paraguay by 8,000 speakers. Lexically, it is 75% similar to Paraguayan Guarani.

The smallest Guarani speaking community in Paraguay is that of the Aché, also known as Guayaki, with a population of 850.

Finally, in the Paraguayan Chaco Department, there are 304 speakers of Eastern Bolivian/Western Argentine Guarani, known locally as Ñandeva or Tapiete. (However, outside Paraguay, Ñandeva refers to Chiripá.)

The largest Guarani group in the Chaco is that known locally as Guarayo who settled in Paraguay after the war with Bolivia (1932–35). They are originally from the Isoso area of Bolivia.

Argentina 
Paraguayan Guarani is an official language in the province of Corrientes, alongside Spanish.

A different variety of Guarani, Western Argentine Guarani, is spoken further west by about 15,000 speakers, mostly in Jujuy, but also in Salta Province. It refers essentially to the same variety of Guarani as Eastern Bolivian Guarani.

Additionally, another variety of Guarani known as Mbyá is spoken in Argentina by 3,000 speakers.

Bolivia 
Eastern Bolivian Guarani and Western Bolivian Guarani are widely spoken in the southeastern provinces of the country.

Eastern Bolivian Guarani, also known as Chawuncu or Chiriguano, is spoken in by 33,670 speakers (or 36,917) in the south-central Parapeti River area and in the city of Tarija. It refers to essentially the same variety of Guarani as Western Argentine Guarani.

Other Guarani groups that exist are the Gwarayú or Guarayos around 30,000, and Sirionó some 800 in Santa Cruz. What remains of the Yuki population estimated at around 240 live in the Dpt. of Cochabamba.

In August 2009 Bolivia launched a Guarani-language university at Kuruyuki in the southeastern province of Chuquisaca which will bear the name of indigenous hero Apiaguaiki Tumpa.

Brazil 

The expansive territory of the Guaraní encompasses a space that traverses the Brazilian, Paraguayan, Argentinian and Uruguayan borders. There are various points of tension in the history of the Guaraní, but this analysis will prioritize three: (i) the arrival of the Jesuits; (ii) the exploitative labour practices of the encomiendas; and finally, (iii) the expropriation of Guaraní land by the Spanish and Portuguese colonizers.

History

The Jesuits 
The arrival of the Jesuits to Guaraní territory in the seventeenth century resulted in a re-organization of the social, political and economic structures of the Guaraní peoples. The communities (commonly referred to as “missions”) that the Jesuits established amassed a total population that surpassed 100 000 Guaraní peoples. The subjugation of the Guaraní people to one social, economic, political, and spiritual order in the missions contributed to a false construction of the Guaraní as a homogeneous people. Wilde articulated it well in his assertion that:The missions constituted an “imagined community” that over the course of 150 years incorporated very diverse populations that had to adapt to a single pattern of spatial and temporal organization.Initially, the Spaniards recognized the differences amongst the indigenous people of the Guaraní territory; yet, Spanish documentation failed to adequately recognize this diversity.

Encomenderos 
The Guaraní were not only subjected to regimented living conditions by the Europeans, but they were also manipulated through exploitative labour practices. The Guaraní were victims of exploitation by both the encomenderos of the Spanish territories as well as by the slave traders of the south of Brazil. Ecomenderos were the recipients of an encomienda. An encomienda was a grant from the crown that allowed specific officials the control over certain indigenous populations with the intention of extracting labour. In other words, Encomenderos granted Guaraní people work in exchange for “protection,” but for the most part, this work arrangement merely facilitated an institutionalized exploitation of labour of the Guaraní people.

Treaty of Madrid 
After the signing of the Treaty of Madrid in 1750, the Guaraní fought for the rights to their territory in a war lasting from 1754 until 1756. This treaty mandated the displacement of numerous Guaraní people living in areas controlled by the Spanish monarchy. The treaty granted the Portuguese monarchy the rights to specific areas previously under Spanish control. The Portuguese complied with the treaty with the condition that the Guaraní people would be removed. In other words, in spite of the Guaraní being central to the stipulations of the treaty, they were completely absent from negotiation processes. The treaty was not upheld after 1761. As a result, the only purpose the treaty fulfilled was the displacement and death of numerous Guaraní people and the destruction of their communities. The Jesuits were expelled from the Guaraní territory in 1767, in part, because of their supposed assistance to the Guaraní in efforts to defend their rights to their territory.

Language Documentation Projects 
In 2014, Brazil's Institute of National Historic and Artistic Heritage (IPHAN) officially recognized Guaraní-Mbyá as being of cultural significance in Brazilian history.  This decision was the product of a pilot project that researched the number of speakers of the language in conjunction with other important indicators. There project was administered by the Political Linguistics Research and Development Institute (IPOL) who conducted research in more than 60 communities, documenting how the speakers defined, transmitted and used their language in daily life. At the end of this project, the findings were published in digital and text format and presented at a conference. The conference afforded the Guaraní an opportunity to express their endorsement of Guaraní-Mbyá being recognized as a cultural reference point in Brazilian history. Additionally, national recognition of the importance of this language granted the public the possibility of re-considering the important value of the Guaraní people to Brazilian history.  It also provided the Guaraní an opportunity to develop stronger feelings of autonomy and agency with regard to their own cultural identities.

In 2009 The Guaraní Project began to be developed in the Documentation Project on Indigenous Culture (PRODOCULT) by the Museu do Indio with funding support from UNESCO and the Banco do Brasil foundation. The purpose of this project is to firstly document Guaraní culture through the words and actions of the Guaraní themselves, as well as aid in indigenous agency and independence through teaching them methodologies for documenting their culture, so they can ultimately tell their own cultural histories. The first phase of this project, and its base purpose, is to train young peoples from five separate Guaraní-Mbyá villages in the southern coasts of Rio de Janeiro in documenting and inventorying both material and non-material culture that they deem to be relevant to themselves in the present day, and their past cultural histories. The other phases of this project aim to introduce those residing in these villages to the process of micro-informatics, and other ways of documenting culture such as through photography.

Language Structure

Phonology 

Note. Data in chart above retrieved from A. Gutman, B. Avanzati, and R. Dooley.

Note. Chart above reprinted from A. Gutman and B. Avanzati.

Morphology

Pronouns 
There are six different types of pronouns in Guarani: (i) personal; (ii) demonstrative; (iii) indefinite; (iv) numeral; (v) negative, and (vi) interrogative.

Personal Pronouns 

Note. Chart above reprinted from R. Dooley.

First person plural pronouns in Guarani are distinguished by the clusivity of the subject being addressed. 

Note. Data in chart reprinted from Estigarribia and Pinta.

Demonstrative Pronouns 

Note. Chart above reprinted from E. Gregores and J. Suarez.

In Guarani, demonstrative pronouns reflect the proximal-distal dimension of the contexts in which the pronouns are used.

Indefinite Pronouns 

Note. Chart above reprinted from E. Gregores and J. Suarez.

Indefinite pronouns are pronouns that are neither people nor place specific.

Numeral Pronouns 

Note. Chart above reprinted from E. Gregores and J. Suarez.

Negative Pronouns  

Note. Chart above reprinted from E. Gregores and J. Suarez.

Negative pronouns in Guarani can be both person and non-person specific.

Interrogative Pronouns  

Note. Chart above reprinted from E. Gregores and J. Suarez.

Guarani interrogative pronouns have the same person and non-person distinction as negative pronouns.

Inflection 
Inflection or inflectional affixes, are the changes in a word to mark differentiations in tense, person, mood, voice, case, and number of speakers. Inflectional affixes can be in turn divided into seven different components.

Reference Based Inflection 
Firstly, there are inflections of personal reference, which can connect to the speaker, addressee, or neither.

Secondly, there is subject reference, which is the inflection that relates to the subject of a conversation, which follow the same structures as personal reference.

Third, there is object reference, which is the inflection used when connecting a person to an object.

Reflexive inflection 
The reflexive inflection within Guarani holds a specific morpheme, that being ‘ye-’. ‘Ye-’ stems together with the morpheme for a subject in a sentence, and is the indicator of whether the subject is the individual undergoing an action, or is the actor themselves.

Reciprocal inflection  
Reciprocal inflection holds the specific morpheme ‘yo-’, which similar to the morpheme for reflexive inflection combines with the subject of a sentence, specifically in third person or plural morphemes.

Desiderative inflection 
The morpheme for desiderative inflection, ‘ta-’. As in the other examples mentioned prior, this morpheme stems together with the subject in a sentence for indicating someone's wish, permission, command, etc.

Commanding inflection 
The commanding inflection represents itself in Guarani with the morpheme ‘e-’, which occurs with verbal stems for the purpose of indicating second person singular command.

Active and Stative Verbs 
Guarani is an active-stative language. In other words, Guarani consists of active transitive verbs as well as both active and stative intransitive verbs. To indicate the subject, active verbs use prefixes. In stative verbs, with the exception of the third person case, the subjects are not marked by prefixes, but by subject pronouns that operate independently and not as suffixes. It is also worth noting that in Guarani, first person plural can be both inclusive and exclusive.

Note. Chart above reprinted from A. Gutman and B. Avanzati.

Note. Chart above reprinted from B. Estigarribia and J. Pinta

Grammar

Valency Change

Valency Increasing 
In Guarani, valency increases occur by modifying the predicates in either valency 1 or valency 2 to the consecutive valency (i.e. valency 2 and 3 respectively for valency 1 and valency 2) (as cited in Estigarribia & Pinta, p. 50).

Causative Voice 
In Guarani, the causative voice is the only voice with the power to increase valency. For example, in the case of intransitive verbs, the causative voice can be observed by the prefix mbo-/mo-. 

Note. Data in chart above retrieved from Estigarribia and Pinta.

The prefixes of the causative voice have the flexibility of functioning as derivational morphemes. 

Note. Data in chart above retrieved from Estigarribia and Pinta.

In the case of transitive clauses, the causative morpheme –uka is used. 

Note. Data in chart above retrieved from Estigarribia and Pinta.

Valency-Decreasing Voices 
In contrast to valency-increasing mechanisms, valency-decreasing mechanisms modify predicates so as to transform valency 2 and 3 to lower valencies. There are three valency-decreasing voices, they are: middle, reciprocal, and anti-passive.

Middle  
The prefix je-/ñe- is used in the middle voice. The middle voice is utilized in contexts expressing passive and reflexive scenarios. 

Note. Data in chart above retrieved from Estigarribia and Pinta.

Reciprocal  
The prefix jo-/ño- indicates that a reciprocal voice is being used. In reciprocal voice, the participants of the clause are both the agent and the patient of one another. 

Note. Data in chart above retrieved from Estigarribia and Pinta.

Anti-passive  
The anti-passive voice can be identified through the prefix poro- and the prefix –mba’e. The prefix “poro-” is utilized in association with human objects and “mba’e-” is used in contexts where inanimate as well as non-human subjects are present. In contrast to the passive middle voice, the anti-passive voice detransivitizes the patient in the transitive clause as opposed to detransitivizing the agent. 

Note. Data in chart above retrieved from Estigarribia and Pinta.

Tense 
In grammar, tense can be defined as a grammatical tool that is used to refer to the time frame in connection to the moment of speaking, with the purpose being to express a specific difference in time in connection to a topic or the speaker. Nominal tense can be defined as an action that is true to an individual in a particular point in time, e.g. “Yesterday, a student knitted’ in which the morphological marker for past tense in English, -ed, is attached to the action made by the student individual.

Temporal Suffixes 
In Guarani, however, verbs are often left unmarked for tense. Instead, the present is left without any type of tense marker or morpheme connected to it indicating it is present. As such, verbs falling under present tense can have relative flexibility in connection to temporality. In other words, verbs in the present tense have the flexibility of also meaning remote past or near future These are known as bare verbs, and refer to events that occur at the time of or shortly before the time of speaking. These sentences can only ever properly be used to answer questions in relation to the past, or in connection to the present, but never about the future.

A relative clause, or a clause used to define the preceding noun  are formed with the particle va’e, which can in turn be combined with past and future morphemes to create different matrixes, as can be seen in examples below.

To connect to tense that is past oriented, the morpheme suffix –kue is used. Translated roughly into English, -kue signifies the ‘ex’ of something, as can be seen in the example below, or as something that exists only in the former. Sometimes -kue can be represented by the allomorph -gue.

The matrix of this term occurs when the relative clause va’e combines with -kue forming, va’ekue. Va’kue can be found in sentences that directly describe past events, or as a connecting anchor to a time before the past event being referenced by the speaker.

In order to connect to future events, the morpheme suffix –rã is used. In English, - rã translates to meaning ‘future’, and it signifies the ‘future’ of something, as can be seen in the example below, or as something that only exists within the future.

Similar to va’ekue, when the relative clause va’e combines with -rã, the morpheme suffix va’erã is formed. Va’erã is used to express a connection to broader future ties, and it can be found in sentences that describe directly future events.

Distribution 
Guarani temporal markers are only productive with indefinites, possessives, demonstratives, and qualification in nominal phrases. Depending on the clarification of the phrase they are in, they may or may not be applicable, as is represented in the chart below. Through analyzing this chart, one can see that -kue is not applicable to artifacts of a food or natural origin, and that -kue is also not applicable when combined with nouns that represent permeant relations.

Note. Chart above reprinted from J. Tonhauser.

Notes

External links 
French website about the Guarani 
Argentinian Languages Collection of Salvador Bucca at the Archive of the Indigenous Languages of Latin America, including audio recordings of 3 spoken stories and one word list in Eastern Bolivian Guaraní.

Guarani languages
Languages of Paraguay
Languages of Argentina
Subject–verb–object languages
Dialects by language